The 1999–2000 Gamma Ethniki was the first unofficial season since the league replaced the C National Amateur Division. Edessaikos was crowned champion, thus winning promotion to Beta Ethniki.

Panarkadikos, Preveza, Olympiakos Loutraki and Panargiakos were relegated to Delta Ethniki.

League table

References

Third level Greek football league seasons
3
Greece